Aymée Martínez Viart (born 17 November 1988) is a Cuban sprinter who specializes in the 400 metres.

Her personal best time is 51.74 seconds, achieved during the heats at the 2007 World Championships in Osaka.

Personal best
100 m: 11.79 s (wind: +0.0 m/s) –  La Habana, 17 June 2011
200 m: 22.99 s (wind: +0.7 m/s) –  Marrakech, 17 July 2005
400 m: 51.74 s –  Osaka, 26 August 2007

Competition record

References

External links

Tilastopaja biography

1988 births
Living people
Cuban female sprinters
Athletes (track and field) at the 2007 Pan American Games
Athletes (track and field) at the 2011 Pan American Games
Athletes (track and field) at the 2012 Summer Olympics
Olympic athletes of Cuba
Pan American Games medalists in athletics (track and field)
Pan American Games gold medalists for Cuba
Medalists at the 2007 Pan American Games
Medalists at the 2011 Pan American Games
Olympic female sprinters
People from San Cristóbal, Cuba